Smaran (aka Smaran Sai) is an Indian music composer who works in Telugu cinema, made his debut with Ajay Bhupathi's RX 100 in 2018. Followed by Krish's Masti's and Anvesh Michael's Kotha Poradu that released on aha in the year 2020.

Filmography

Films

Web series

Discography
 2020 - Saami Saami (Chivaraku Migiledhi)
 2021 - Thodu Dongalu (Pickpocket)
2021 - Toxication (Pickpocket)
2021 - Mohana (Ranganaayaki)
2023 - Ramachandra (Phalana)

References

External links

Telugu film score composers
Indian male film score composers
Indian film score composers
21st-century Indian composers
Living people
21st-century male musicians
Year of birth missing (living people)